Amirabad-e Sarzeh (also Romanized as Amīrābād-e Sarzeh) is a village in Mud Rural District, Mud District, Sarbisheh County, South Khorasan Province, Iran. At the 2006 census, its population was 106, living in 28 families.

References 

Populated places in Sarbisheh County